Stropones is a small village and a community in the island of Euboea in central Greece. It has about 500 residents and it is located in central Euboea,  from Chalcis. A popular beach, called Paralia Chiliadou, is located a few kilometres from Stropones.

Villages
Stropones, pop. 498
Paralia Chiliadou, pop. 63
Lamari, pop. 66
Agia Eirini, pop. 23

Historical population

External links
Stropones on GTP Travel Pages (in English and Greek)
http://www.servitoros.gr/evia-tourist-guide/en/central/steni/2.shtml
http://www.e-city.gr/evia/home/view/2304.php

See also
List of settlements in the Euboea regional unit

References

Populated places in Euboea